CHRNA7-FAM7A fusion protein is a protein that in humans is encoded by the CHRFAM7A gene.

The nicotinic acetylcholine receptors (nAChRs) are members of a superfamily of ligand-gated ion channels that mediate fast signal transmission at synapses. The family member CHRNA7, which is located on chromosome 15 in a region associated with several neuropsychiatric disorders, is partially duplicated and forms a hybrid with a novel gene from the family with sequence similarity 7 (FAM7A). Alternative splicing has been observed, and two variants exist, for this hybrid gene. The N-terminally truncated products predicted by the largest open reading frames for each variant would lack the majority of the neurotransmitter-gated ion-channel ligand binding domain but retain the transmembrane region that forms the ion channel. Although current evidence supports transcription of this hybrid gene, translation of the nicotinic acetylcholine receptor-like protein-encoding open reading frames has not been confirmed.
CHRFAM7A has not been found in nonhuman primates, and its occurrence in individuals of African descent is significantly lower than in Caucasian populations.

References

External links

Further reading

Genes on human chromosome 15
Human proteins